Crowne Plaza Shanghai Anting Golf is a hotel in the city of Shanghai, China. It is known for being the first five-star international hotel in the district of Jiading.

It is a 415-room hotel located at No. 6555 Boyuan Road. It has an 18-hole golf course. Time Out Shanghai said, "The traditional business hotel décor is also livened up with quirky Weibo-worthy design touches that will have you whipping out your camera – think a giant-size arm chair that can fit four and matching cigar in the lounge bar and a family of brass ducks taking a walk through the lobby."

References

External links
 Official website

Hotel buildings completed in 2012
2012 establishments in China
Crowne Plaza hotels
Hotels in Shanghai
Sports venues in Shanghai